Jackey Jackey (also spelled Jacky Jacky) (1833–1854) is the name by which Galmahra (a.k.a. Galmarra), the Aboriginal Australian guide and companion to surveyor Edmund Kennedy was known. He survived Edmund Kennedy's fatal 1848 expedition into Cape York Peninsula (in present-day Queensland) and was subsequently formally recognized for heroic deeds by the then colony of New South Wales in words engraved on a solid silver breastplate or gorget which read as follows:

Presented by His Excellency Sir Charles Augustus FitzRoy K.D. Governor of New South Wales, to Jackey Jackey, an Aboriginal native of that colony. In testimony of the fidelity with which he followed the late Assistant Surveyor E.B.C. Kennedy, throughout the exploration of York Peninsula in the year 1848; the noble daring with which he supported that lamented gentleman, when mortally wounded by the Natives of Escape River, the courage with which after having affectionately tended the last moments of his Master, he made his way through hostile Tribes and an unknown Country, to Cape York; and finally the unexampled sagacity with which he conducted the succour that there awaited the Expedition to the rescue of the other survivors of it, who had been left at Shelbourne Bay.

The name "Jackey Jackey" since entered general Australian plus Aboriginal Australian slang

For whites it was a generic dismissive, denying blacks their individuality and hence their dignity. To blacks it meant a collaborator, the subservient native complicit in his own people's dispossession.

Biographical details 
As a young man, Galmahra seems to have grown up and lived at Jerrys Plains near Muswellbrook, New South Wales, most likely as a member of the local Australian Aboriginal nation: the Wonnarua.

In April 1848, still a young man, Galmahra was asked to accompany and help guide Assistant Surveyor Edmund Kennedy and team (including botanist William Carron) on an expedition through unknown country heading up into Cape York Peninsula.  On that expedition Galmahra proved his value (including bush skills) and turned out to be a loyal and resilient member of the expedition upon whom Edmund Kennedy increasingly relied until he died, speared by Yadhaykenu (a.k.a. Jathaikana) people in the northern Peninsula area (December 1848), somewhere near the Escape River.

Following an inquiry into Edmund Kennedy and other expedition members deaths, Galmahra became more generally known to the colony of New South Wales as Jackey Jackey: an Aboriginal Australian to be honored for his loyalty, heroic deeds, and general assistance to the expedition. By March 1849 a lithographic portrait of 'Jackey Jackey' had been produced for sale, and by the beginning of 1851 the Governor of New South Wales had presented him with a specially made, pure silver breastplate (see above) plus a £50 bank account gratuity.

Galmahra never wore the breastplate, never accessed the £50 bank account, and did not seem to have otherwise been fully engaged or employed by the colony.  Instead he gained a reputation for enjoying his alcohol and, in 1854, after drinking too much during an overland journey to Albury, New South Wales, fell into a campfire and died.

On-line newspaper articles

Places named after Jackey Jackey
 Jacky Jacky Creek, Tablelands Region
 Jacky Jacky Range, Cook Shire
 Jackey Jackey Creek
 Jackey Jackey Airfield

See also
 Edmund Kennedy

References

External links
 

 

Explorers of Australia
1833 births
1854 deaths
History of Australia (1788–1850)
 
Australian Aboriginal guides
Aboriginal peoples of New South Wales